Lookaftering is the second studio album by Vashti Bunyan. It was released via FatCat Records on October 17, 2005. It is the follow-up to 1970's Just Another Diamond Day.

Reception
At Metacritic, which assigns a weighted average score out of 100 to reviews from mainstream critics, Lookaftering received an average score of 85% based on 21 reviews, indicating "universal acclaim".

Thom Jurek of AllMusic gave the album 4 stars out of 5, calling it "a gorgeously considered, stunningly and sensitively crafted album by an artist who is truly outside of all fashion, all time, and even space." He added, "Without the technological trappings, this album, timeless and spaceless as it is, could have been made 300 years ago, but that it was made in the 21st century blesses you even more."

Pitchfork placed it at number 44 on its list of the "Top 50 Albums of 2005". PopMatters placed it at number 50 on its list of the "Best 50 Albums of 2005".

Track listing

Personnel
 Vashti Bunyan – acoustic guitar, vocals
 Max Richter – piano, glockenspiel, Hammond organ, Mellotron, vibraphone, Fender Rhodes, wineglasses
 Kevin Barker – electric guitar
 Devendra Banhart – acoustic guitar
 Marcelo DeOliviera – acoustic guitar
 Rebecca Wood – oboe, cor anglais
 Robert Kirby – French horn, trumpet
 Joanna Newsom – harp
 Adam Pierce – dulcimer
 Adem – harmonium, autoharp
 Fiona Brice – strings
 Ian Burdge – strings
 Gillon Cameron – strings
 John Mercalfe – strings
 Frances Dewar – strings

References

External links
 

2005 albums
Vashti Bunyan albums
FatCat Records albums